Praewprao Petchyindee Academy (แพรวพราว เพชรยินดีอะคาเดมี่) is a Thai Muay Thai fighter. He is the former Rajadamnern Stadium and current WBC Muaythai Light Flyweight champion.

Muay Thai career
On November 25, 2016, Praewprao fought Samingdet Nor.Anuwatgym for the True4U Mini Flyweight title at the Rangsit Stadium. He won the fight by a second-round knockout.

On June 6, 2018, Praewprao fought Banluerit Sitwatcharachai for the vacant WBC Muaythai World Light Flyweight title. He won the fight by a third-round knockout. Three months later, he rematched Chanalert Meenayothin for the vacant Rajadamnern Stadium 108 lbs title. Chanalert was more successful in the rematch, winning the fight by a decision.

Two months after his first Rajadamnern Stadium title fight, Praewprao once again fought for the title, held at the time by Phetanuwat Nor.Anuwatgym. Praewprao won by decision.

For the his first Rajadamnern title defense, Praewprao was scheduled to fight Sungfah Nor.Anuwatgym. Sungfah won the fight, and title, by decision.

Five months after his Rajadamnern title loss, Praewprao fought a rematch with Sangfah Nor.Anuwatgym for the Rajadamnern Stadium 108 lbs title. The fight was simultaneously a defense of his WBC Muay Thai World title. He beat Sangfah by unanimous decision.

Titles and accomplishments
True4U Muaymanwansuk
 2016 True4U Mini Flyweight Champion
World Boxing Council Muay Thai
 2018 WBC Muay Thai World 108 lbs Champion (One successful title defense)
World Muay Thai Council
 WMC World Champion
Rajadamnern Stadium
 2018 Rajadamnern Stadium 108 lbs Champion
 2019 Rajadamnern Stadium 108 lbs Champion

Fight record

|- style="background:#cfc" 
| 2023-02-11 ||Win ||align="left" | Nima Jahanshas || Rajadamnern World Series + Petchyindee  || Bangkok, Thailand ||Decision (unanimous)||3 ||3:00 
|-  style="background:#fbb;"
| 2022-09-20 || Loss ||align=left| Waewwow Wor.Wangprom || Muaymansananmuang, Rangsit Stadium || Pathum Thani, Thailand || Decision || 5 || 3:00
|-  style="background:#cfc;"
| 2022-06-23 || Win ||align=left| Dinnuathong SorJor.OleyYasothon || Petchyindee, Rajadamnern Stadium || Bangkok, Thailand || Decision || 5 || 3:00 
|-  style="background:#fbb;"
| 2022-05-12 || Loss ||align=left| Dinnuathong SorJor.OleyYasothon || Petchyindee, Rajadamnern Stadium || Bangkok, Thailand || Decision || 5 || 3:00
|-  style="background:#cfc;"
| 2022-03-03 || Win ||align=left| Kaenkaew Sor.Boonmeerit || Petchyindee, Rajadamnern Stadium || Bangkok, Thailand || Decision || 5 || 3:00 
|-  style="background:#cfc;"
| 2021-10-08 || Win ||align=left| Fourwin Sitjaroensap || True4U Muaymanwansuk, Rangsit Stadium || Buriram, Thailand || TKO (knees) || 2 || 
|-  style="background:#cfc;"
| 2021-04-08|| Win ||align=left| Cherry Mor.RajabhatSurin || SuekMahakamMuayRuamPonKon Chana + Petchyindee|| Songkhla province, Thailand || Decision || 5 || 3:00
|-  style="background:#fbb;"
| 2021-03-12|| Loss||align=left| Petchsila Wor.Auracha || True4U Muaymanwansuk, Rangsit Stadium || Rangsit, Thailand || Decision || 5 || 3:00
|-  style="background:#fbb;"
| 2020-09-18|| Loss||align=left| Tabtimthong SorJor.Lekmuangnon || True4U Muaymanwansuk, Rangsit Stadium || Rangsit, Thailand ||KO (Elbow) ||2  ||
|-  style="background:#cfc;"
| 2020-08-14|| Win||align=left| MalaiNgern Somwanggaiyang || True4U Muaymanwansuk, Rangsit Stadium || Rangsit, Thailand ||KO (Punches) ||3  ||
|-  style="background:#cfc;"
| 2020-07-17 || Win ||align=left| Sangfah Nor.AnuwatGym || True4U Muaymanwansuk, Rangsit Stadium || Rangsit, Thailand ||Decision || 5 || 3:00
|-  style="background:#cfc;"
| 2020-01-27|| Win||align=left| Waewwow Wor.Wangprom  || Rajadamnern Stadium||Bangkok, Thailand || Decision || 5 || 3:00
|-  style="background:#cfc;"
| 2019-12-05|| Win||align=left| Sangfah Nor.Anuwatgym  || Rajadamnern Stadium||Bangkok, Thailand || Decision (Unanimous)|| 5 || 3:00  
|-
! style=background:white colspan=9 |
|-  style="background:#cfc;"
| 2019-11-08|| Win||align=left| Hongtae Rinmuaythai  || Lumpinee Stadium||Bangkok, Thailand || KO (Straight to the Body) || 2 ||
|-  style="background:#fbb;"
| 2019-10-18|| Loss||align=left| Hongtae Rinmuaythai  || Rajadamnern Stadium||Bangkok, Thailand || Decision || 5 || 3:00
|-  style="background:#cfc;"
| 2019-09-13|| Win||align=left| Suntos Sor.Saranphat  || ||Thailand || KO || 4 ||
|-  style="background:#fbb;"
| 2019-07-11|| Loss||align=left| Sungfah Nor.Anuwatgym  || Rajadamnern Stadium||Bangkok, Thailand || Decision || 5 || 3:00 
|-
! style=background:white colspan=9 |
|-  style="background:#fbb;"
| 2019-06-13|| Loss||align=left| Suntos Sor.Saranphat  || Rajadamnern Stadium||Bangkok, Thailand || Decision || 5 || 3:00
|-  style="background:#cfc;"
| 2019-02-21|| Win ||align=left| Phetanuwat Nor.Anuwatgym  || Rajadamnern Stadium||Bangkok, Thailand || Decision || 5 || 3:00
|-  style="background:#cfc;"
| 2018-12-26|| Win ||align=left| Sayanlek Sayangym  || Rajadamnern Stadium||Bangkok, Thailand || Decision || 5 || 3:00
|-  style="background:#cfc;"
| 2018-11-22|| Win ||align=left| Phetanuwat Nor.Anuwatgym  || Rajadamnern Stadium||Bangkok, Thailand || Decision || 5 || 3:00 
|-
! style=background:white colspan=9 |
|-  style="background:#cfc;"
| 2018-10-25|| Win ||align=left| Phetpanlan Big-M Gym   || Rajadamnern Stadium||Bangkok, Thailand || KO (Knees and Elbows) || 3 ||
|-  style="background:#fbb;"
| 2018-09-13|| Loss||align=left| Chanalert Meenayothin  || Rajadamnern Stadium||Bangkok, Thailand || Decision || 5 || 3:00 
|-
! style=background:white colspan=9 |
|-  style="background:#cfc;"
| 2018-08-09|| Win ||align=left| Chanalert Meenayothin  || Rajadamnern Stadium||Bangkok, Thailand || Decision || 5 || 3:00
|-  style="background:#cfc;"
| 2018-06-08|| Win||align=left| Banluerit Sitwatcharachai || Rajadamnern Stadium||Bangkok, Thailand || TKO (Knees) || 3 || 
|-
! style=background:white colspan=9 |
|-  style="background:#cfc;"
| 2018-05-09|| Win||align=left| Sangfah Anuwatgym || Rajadamnern Stadium||Bangkok, Thailand || TKO (Doctor Stoppage) || 4 ||
|-  style="background:#fbb;"
| 2018-01-31|| Loss||align=left| Sangfah Anuwatgym || Rajadamnern Stadium||Bangkok, Thailand || Decision|| 5 || 3:00
|-  style="background:#cfc;"
| 2018-01-31|| Win||align=left| Kaipa 13CoinsResort || Rajadamnern Stadium||Bangkok, Thailand || Decision|| 5 || 3:00
|-  style="background:#fbb;"
| 2017-12-04|| Loss||align=left| Rit Jitmuangnon || Rajadamnern Stadium||Bangkok, Thailand || Decision|| 5 || 3:00
|-  style="background:#cfc;"
| 2017-11-09|| Win||align=left| Rit Jitmuangnon || Rajadamnern Stadium||Bangkok, Thailand || Decision|| 5 || 3:00
|-  style="background:#cfc;"
| 2017-08-08|| Win||align=left| Nengern Lukjaomaesaivari || Lumpinee Stadium||Bangkok, Thailand || Decision|| 5 || 3:00
|-  style="background:#c5d2ea;"
| 2017-07-26|| Draw||align=left| Nengern Lukjaomaesaivari || Rajadamnern Stadium||Bangkok, Thailand || Decision|| 5 || 3:00
|-  style="background:#fbb;"
| 2017-06-21|| Loss||align=left| Yoktong Pinsinchai  || Rajadamnern Stadium||Bangkok, Thailand || Decision|| 5 || 3:00
|-  style="background:#fbb;"
| 2017-04-19|| Loss||align=left| Yoktong Pinsinchai  || Rajadamnern Stadium||Bangkok, Thailand || Decision|| 5 || 3:00
|-  style="background:#cfc;"
| 2017-03-02|| Win||align=left| Offsai Sor.Jor.Wichitpadriew    || Rajadamnern Stadium||Bangkok, Thailand || Decision|| 5 || 3:00
|-  style="background:#fbb;"
| 2017-01-05|| Loss||align=left| Banluerit Sitwatcharachai   || Rajadamnern Stadium||Bangkok, Thailand || KO|| 4 ||
|-  style="background:#cfc;"
| 2016-11-25|| Win||align=left| Samingdet Nor.Anuwatgym  || Rangsit Stadium||Rangsit, Thailand || KO ||2 ||   
|-
! style=background:white colspan=9 |
|-  style="background:#fbb;"
| 2016-09-09|| Loss||align=left| Saenchon Erawan  || Rangsit Stadium||Rangsit, Thailand || Decision|| 5 || 3:00
|-  style="background:#fbb;"
| 2016-07-14|| Loss||align=left| Domthong Lukjaophorrongtom  || Rajadamnern Stadium||Bangkok, Thailand || Decision || 5 || 3:00
|-  style="background:#c5d2ea;"
| 2016-06-22|| Draw||align=left| Rakthukon UbonRatchat || Central Stadium||Roi Et, Thailand || Decision|| 5 || 3:00
|-  style="background:#cfc;"
| 2016-05-23|| Win||align=left| Rit Sor.Visetkit  || Rajadamnern Stadium||Bangkok, Thailand || KO || 3 ||
|-  style="background:#cfc;"
| 2016-04-25|| Win||align=left| Rit Sor.Visetkit  || Rajadamnern Stadium||Bangkok, Thailand || Decision|| 5 || 3:00
|-  style="background:#c5d2ea;"
| 2016-03-22|| Draw||align=left| Saenchon Erawan  || Lumpinee Stadium||Bangkok, Thailand || Decision|| 5 || 3:00
|-  style="background:#cfc;"
| 2016-02-29|| Win ||align=left| Somraknoi Muay789  || Rajadamnern Stadium||Bangkok, Thailand || KO|| 3 ||
|-  style="background:#fbb;"
| 2016-01-21|| Loss||align=left| Rit Sor.Visetkit  || Rajadamnern Stadium||Bangkok, Thailand || Decision|| 5 || 3:00
|-  style="background:#fbb;"
| 2015-12-12|| Loss||align=left| Saenchon Erawan   || Siam Omnoi Boxing Stadium ||Samut Sakhon, Thailand || Decision|| 5 || 3:00
|-  style="background:#fbb;"
| 2015-11-09|| Loss||align=left| Saenchon Erawan   || Rajadamnern Stadium||Bangkok, Thailand || Decision|| 5 || 3:00
|-  style="background:#cfc;"
| 2015-10-15|| Win ||align=left| Banluerit Sitwatcharachai   || Rajadamnern Stadium||Bangkok, Thailand || KO|| 3 ||
|-  style="background:#cfc;"
| 2015-09-15|| Win ||align=left| Jakphet MiamiCondoBangpu  || Lumpinee Stadium||Bangkok, Thailand || KO|| 4 ||
|-  style="background:#fbb;"
| 2015-06-29|| Loss||align=left| Banluerit Sitwatcharachai   || ||Udon Thani, Thailand || Decision|| 5 || 3:00
|-  style="background:#cfc;"
| 2015-05-21|| Win ||align=left| Banluerit Sitwatcharachai   || Rajadamnern Stadium||Bangkok, Thailand || Decision|| 5 || 3:00
|-  style="background:#cfc;"
| 2015-04-08|| Win ||align=left| Robert Fightermuaythai  || Rajadamnern Stadium||Bangkok, Thailand || KO|| 2 ||
|-  style="background:#cfc;"
| 2015-01-22|| Win ||align=left| Robert Fightermuaythai  || Rajadamnern Stadium||Bangkok, Thailand || Decision || 5 || 3:00
|-  style="background:#fbb;"
| 2015-01-22|| Loss||align=left| Chawarit Kiatchaiyuth  || Rajadamnern Stadium||Bangkok, Thailand || KO || 3 || 
|-
| colspan=9 | Legend:

See also
 List of male kickboxers
 List of WBC Muaythai world champions

References

Praewprao PetchyindeeAcademy
Living people
1998 births
Flyweight kickboxers
Praewprao PetchyindeeAcademy